The Nigerian Defence Headquarters (DHQ) is the principal headquarters of the Nigerian Armed Forces. It is situated in the Armed Forces Complex, which also houses the Nigerian Army, Air Force and Naval Headquarters.

The DHQ is responsible for deployment, sustenance and recovery of forces deployed externally or within the country.

History 
Nigeria operated a variant of the Pakistani Joint Staff Headquarters and the American Pentagon structure. In the constitution that came after the 1979 Nigerian presidential election the Defence Headquarters (DHQ) was established to enable the CDS carry out his duties. It was abolished by the Buhari regime in 1983. The DHQ was reestablished and changed in 1985 to Joint Headquarters (JHQ) with the creation of the Chairman of the Joint Chiefs of Staff. In September 1990, the nomenclature reverted to the DHQ.

Operations 
It conducts joint cooperation ventures with TRADOC.

References 

Military of Nigeria
Joint military headquarters
Military units and formations of Nigeria
Military units and formations established in 1918
1991 establishments in Nigeria